Marin Draganja and Mate Pavić won the inaugural tournament, beating Aljaž Bedene and Blaž Rola 6–3, 1–6, [10–5].

Seeds

Draw

Draw

References
 Main Draw

2013 Tilia Slovenia Openandnbsp;- Doubles
2013 Doubles